Grit Hammer, née Haupt (born 4 June 1966 in Saalfeld, Bezirk Gera) is a retired German shot putter.

She represented the sports club SC Motor Jena, and won the silver medal at the East German championships in 1987. She put the shot 20.72 metres in June 1987 in Neubrandenburg.

International competitions

References

External links
 

1966 births
Living people
People from Saalfeld
People from Bezirk Gera
German female shot putters
East German female shot putters
Sportspeople from Thuringia